Ferenc Snétberger (born 6 February 1957) is a Hungarian jazz guitarist.

Biography
Snétberger was born into a Romani family. At the age of thirteen, he attended music school and studied classical guitar.  From 1977 to 1981 he studied at Bela Bartók Jazz Conservatory in Budapest.

In 1987, he formed the Stendahl Trio with László Dés and Kornél Horváth, and in 2005 a trio with Arild Andersen and Italian drummer Paolo Vinaccia. He appeared in Joyosa-Kvartetten with German trumpeter Markus Stockhausen, Norwegian bassist Arild Andersen, and Swiss drummer Samuel Rohrer. He has also worked with Joey Baron, Charlie Byrd, Herb Ellis, Richard Bona, Bobby McFerrin, David Friedman, Michel Godard, Anders Jormin, Didier Lockwood, James Moody, and Ernie Wilkins. He has composed film music and "For My People" for guitar and orchestra. His son, Toni Snétberger, is an actor.

On the German Holocaust Remembrance Day (27 January 2011) concluded Snétberger celebration in plenary by the German Bundestag, with a Sinto when Zoni Weisz first held eulogy.

He founded the Snétberger Music Talent Center, an international music school for disadvantaged children and young people, mainly minority of Sinti and Romani origin. The school opened in 2011.

Honours and awards

Discography

As leader
 Signature (Enja, 1995)
 Samboa (Sentemo, 1991)
 Bajotambo (Sentemo, 1992)
 The Budapest Concert (Enja, 1996)
 Obsession (Tiptoe 1998)
 For My People with the Franz Liszt Chamber Orchestra, Budapest (Enja, 2000)
 Balance (Enja, 2002)
 Joyosa with Markus Stockhausen, Arild Andersen, Patrice Heral (Enja, 2004)
 Nomad with Arild Andersen, Paolo Vinaccia (Enja, 2005)
 Streams with Markus Stockhausen (Enja, 2007)
 In Concert (ECM, 2016)
 Titok (ECM, 2017)
 Hallgató (ECM, 2021)

References

External links
 Official site
 Snétberger at ECM Records
 YouTube channel
 

1957 births
Hungarian jazz guitarists
Male jazz musicians
Male guitarists
Living people
Hungarian male musicians
Commander's Crosses of the Order of Merit of the Republic of Hungary (civil)
Knight's Crosses of the Order of Merit of the Republic of Hungary (civil)
Recipients of the Cross of the Order of Merit of the Federal Republic of Germany